is a former Japanese football player. He played for Japan national team.

Club career
Hanyu was born in Chiba on December 22, 1979. After graduating from University of Tsukuba, he joined his local club JEF United Ichihara (later JEF United Chiba) in 2002. He immediately broke into the first team and played in the opening league match against Kyoto Purple Sanga on March 3, 2002. He eventually played 22 games and scored 2 goals in his first professional season. He played many matches as offensive midfielder from first season. The club won the champions 2005 and 2006 J.League Cup. He moved to FC Tokyo in 2008. The club won 2009 J.League Cup. The club was relegated to J2 League end of 2010 season. In 2011, the club won the champions J2 League and Emperor's Cup. Fis opportunity to play decreased for injury from 2012 and he moved to Ventforet Kofu on loan in 2013. He returned to FC Tokyo in 2014. He moved to JEF United Chiba in 2017. He played the club for the first time in 10 years and retired end of the season.

National team career
Hanyu represented Japan for the 2001 Summer Universiade held in Beijing when he was a University of Tsukuba student. He was instrumental in Japan's winning the tournament by scoring total 3 goals including the lone goal in the final against Ukraine.

He made his first appearance for the Japan national team on August 13, 2006 in an 2007 Asian Cup qualification against Yemen when he replaced Yuichi Komano at half time. He was the member of the Japan team for the 2007 Asian Cup finals and played five games as a substitute. In the third place play-off against South Korea, Hanyu was sent on to the pitch to replace Kengo Nakamura in the 72nd minute, in a 0-0 draw. A penalty shootout was required to break the deadlock and he missed the sixth penalty shot for Japan. Japan lost the shootout and finished 4th in the tournament. He played 17 games for Japan until 2008.

Club statistics

National team statistics

Appearances in major competitions

Honors and awards

Teams
 JEF United Chiba
 J.League Cup: 2005, 2006
 FC Tokyo
 J2 League: 2011
 Emperor's Cup: 2011
 J.League Cup: 2009

References

External links

 
Japan National Football Team Database

Profile at JEF United Chiba

1979 births
Living people
University of Tsukuba alumni
Association football people from Chiba Prefecture
Japanese footballers
Japan international footballers
J1 League players
J2 League players
JEF United Chiba players
FC Tokyo players
Ventforet Kofu players
2007 AFC Asian Cup players
Association football midfielders